IntelliQuote Insurance Services is an American online life insurance agency. Originally headquartered out of the founder's Folsom, California home, Intelliquote is now in El Dorado Hills, California.

Founding and development
Founded in 1997 by president and CEO Gary Lardy, IntelliQuote was one of the first online life insurance agencies. In its second year, IntelliQuote began expanding business operations and by 2000 had 17 employees. In the year following the company's 2002 incorporation, IntelliQuote placed over 10,000 policies, becoming one of the largest online life insurance agencies.

Products
 Term life insurance 
 Permanent life insurance
 Universal life (UL) insurance

Awards and recognitions
In 2004, IntelliQuote was awarded the Transamerica Corporation Leading New General Agency Award. In 2006, IntelliQuote was featured in Forbes Magazine's Best of the Web, and was awarded Prudential Financial's Rock Solid Performer Award.

Advertising
IntelliQuote's consumer outreach and advertising have primarily focused on electronic communication such as social media. In 2013 the company introduced a social media campaign on its corporate blog called the "Everyday Superhero" campaign, featuring a young boy donning a cape and suggesting that there is a hero in everyone.

Associations
 Member Company of the LIFE Foundation
 Charter Member of the Life Insurance Direct Marketers Association

Key Staff
 Carey Wolf, Vice President of Sales

References

Life insurance companies of the United States
American companies established in 1997
Financial services companies established in 1997
Companies based in California